Robert, Rob, Bob, Bobby or Robbie Turner may refer to:

Arts

Robert Chapman Turner (1913–2005), American potter
Robert Turner (composer) (1920–2012), Canadian composer
Robert Levon Been (born 1978), a.k.a. Robert Turner, American musician
Robby Turner (born 1962), American steel guitar player

Politics

U.S. politics

Bob Turner (Texas politician) (1934–2022), American politician from Texas
Bob Turner (New York politician) (born 1941), congressman from New York
Robert L. Turner (born 1947), Democratic member of the Wisconsin State Assembly

Other politics

Robert Turner (MP) (fl. 1597–1601), English Member of Parliament for Downton and Old Sarum
Bob Turner, Canadian politician, unsuccessful candidate in Manitoba Liberal Party candidates, 1995 Manitoba provincial election
Bob Turner (Canadian politician) (born 1948), Canadian politician from Alberta

Science and technology

Robert Lowry Turner (1923–1990),  cancer research pioneer
Robert Turner (professor of medicine) (1938–1999), professor in diabetes and endocrinology
Robert Turner (scientist) (born 1946), MRI physicist

Sports

American football

Bobby Turner (born 1949), American football coach
Robert Turner (defensive back) (1971–1991), American college football player
Rob Turner (born 1984), American football offensive lineman

Cricket

Robert Turner (Middlesex cricketer), 18th-century English cricketer
Bob Turner (cricketer, born 1885) (1885–1959), English cricketer
Robert Turner (Nottinghamshire cricketer) (1888–1947), English cricketer
Robert Turner (cricketer, born 1967), English cricketer

Other sports

Robert Turner (footballer) (1877–?), English footballer
Bob Turner (baseball) (1926–1962), American baseball player
Bob Turner (ice hockey) (1934–2005), Canadian ice hockey player
Bob Turner (footballer, born 1936), Australian footballer for Melbourne
Bob Turner (footballer, born 1942), Australian footballer for Footscray
Robbie Turner (born 1966), English footballer
Robert Turner (canoeist), British slalom canoer in 1998 European Canoe Slalom Championships

Other
Robbie Turner (drag queen)
Robert Turner (divine) (died 1599), Scottish Roman Catholic divine
Robert Turner (Bahá'í) (died 1909), First African American Bahá’í
Robert Edward Turner III (born 1938), American media mogul
Robert F. Turner (born 1944), professor of international law and national security law
Leigh Turner (Robert Leigh Turner, born 1958), British diplomat
Robert Turner (poker player), American professional poker player

See also
Bert Turner (disambiguation)